Clogher Record is a local history journal published annually since 1953 by the Clogher Historical Society (Irish: Cumann Seanchais Chlochair). It covers the history of Counties Fermanagh, Monaghan, and South Tyrone, as well as covering a tiny part of South Donegal.

External links
 

Irish history journals
Publications established in 1953
English-language journals
Annual journals